There are two London Underground stations called Hammersmith:

 Hammersmith tube station (District and Piccadilly lines)
 Hammersmith tube station (Circle and Hammersmith & City lines)

See also
 Hammersmith & Chiswick railway station
 Hammersmith (Grove Road) railway station

Disambig-Class London Transport articles